The 1952 Sylvania Television Awards were presented on December 11, 1952, at Hotel Pierre in New York City. The Sylvania Awards were established in 1951 by Sylvania Electric Products. Deems Taylor was the chairman of the judges committee.

The following awards were presented:
 Grand award - Victory at Sea, NBC, Henry Solomon, producer; award accepted by Secretary of the Navy Dan A. Kimball and NBC president Joseph H. McConnell
 Best comedy program - I Love Lucy
 Best dramatic series - Robert Montgomery Presents
 Best documentary melodramas - Treasury Men in Action
 Best program of current news - See It Now
 Most noteworthy contributions to variety shows - Toast of the Town, CBS
 Outstanding sports telecasts - 1952 World Series, with awards to NBC and the Gillette Safety Razor Company, with citations to the remote camera crews of WPIX and WOR-TV, for initiating telecasts of the 1952 World Series
 Definite contribution to creative TV technique - Broadway Television Theatre, WOR-TV, New York
 Public service in giving the country's youth its own program - Youth Wants To Know, NBC
 Best local public service series - The Whole Town's Talking and In Our Care, WOI-TV at Iowa State College, Ames, Iowa
 Best and most original children's program - Summer School, WCAU, Philadelphia
 Best special events coverage - The four networks and the three sponsors (Admiral, Motorola, and Philco) for coverage of the 1952 political campaigns
 Best in commercials - Standard Oil of New Jersey
 For pioneering and developing daytime TV - DuMont Television Network and Sylvester L. Weaver Jr., NBC

No awards were made for best actor and actress, as the committee noted that the best performances came "from guest stars borrowed from the legitimate stage or motion pictures."

References

Sylvania Awards